Gaboury (French: nickname for a joker derived from Old French gabeor "mocker, scoffer, joker") is a surname.

People with the surname include:
 Amédée Gaboury (1838–1912), Canadian politician
 Étienne Gaboury (1930–2022), Canadian architect
 Kim Gaboury, AKA aKido, Canadian musician and composer
 Marie-Anne Gaboury (1780–1875), Canadian explorer and settler, grandmother of Louis Riel
 Stephen Gaboury, American musician and record producer
 Tancrède-Charles Gaboury (1851–1937), Canadian politician
Surnames from nicknames

French-language surnames